Saint-Quentin station (French: Gare de Saint-Quentin) is a railway station serving the town Saint-Quentin, Aisne department, northern France. It is situated on the Creil–Jeumont railway.

The station is served by regional trains to Compiègne, Amiens, Cambrai and Paris.

References

Railway stations in Aisne
Railway stations in France opened in 1850